Vendetta is a 1995 Swedish film directed by Mikael Håfström and starring Stefan Sauk as the Swedish intelligence officer Carl Hamilton and as his adversary Don Tommaso, Ennio Fantastichini. It was released to cinemas in Sweden on 10 February 1995. A television miniseries was filmed at the same time. It aired as six episodes of 50–60 minutes each.

Plot
Carl Hamilton is assigned to go to Sicily to free two Swedish businessmen who are held captive by a local villain named Don Tommaso. The Don wants a Swedish naval robot system in exchange for his hostages. In the beginning Hamilton acts merely as a negotiator, but when he cannot accept the demands of his counterpart, the situation escalates.

Hamilton stands up against Don Tommaso, while abduction and murder becomes the language of negotiation. A classical vendetta is initiated, as narcotics from Colombia and the Italian intelligence community become involved.

Cast
Stefan Sauk as commander Carl Hamilton, naval officer and intelligence operative
Ennio Fantastichini as Don Tommaso 
Luigi Di Fiori as Giulio, Don Tommaso's brother
Erland Josephson as the grey eminence of Swedish intelligence, "DG"
Roland Hedlund as Samuel Ulfsson, Naval Commodore, and Chief of the Military Intelligence Service's operative department OP5
Mats Långbacka as captain Åke Stålhandske, Swedish marine officer and intelligence operative
Per Graffman as captain Joar Lundwall, Swedish marine officer and intelligence operative
Antonio Di Ponziano as lieutenant Luigi Bertoni-Svensson, Swedish marine officer and intelligence operative
Orso Maria Guerrini as lieutenant general Giuseppe Cortini 
Oliver Tobias as colonel Gustavo Da Piemonte
Marika Lagercrantz as Eva-Britt Hamilton, Carl's wife
Malin Lagerhem as Johanna-Louise Hamilton, Carl's daughter
Paolo Maria Scalondro as Nitto Stradella, don Tommaso's bodyguard
Stig Engström as Johan Carlemar, Technical Manager, Swedish Armament
Claes Ljungmark as Gustav Hansson, Sales Manager, Swedish Armament
Pasquale Anselmo as Enrico
Leonardo De Carmine as Roberto
Ralf Wolter and Carlo Barsotti (the voice) as Don Giovanni
Marcello Tusco as Don Salvatore
Renato Carpentieri as Aldo Sabatini

References

External links

1995 films
1990s crime action films
1995 crime thriller films
1995 action drama films
1990s spy films
1990s English-language films
English-language Swedish films
Films about kidnapping
Swedish films about revenge
Films about the Sicilian Mafia
Films directed by Mikael Håfström
Films set in Italy
Films set in Sweden
Swedish action films
Swedish crime thriller films
Swedish spy films
1995 directorial debut films
1995 drama films
1990s Swedish films